Solabladet (The Sola Gazette) is a local Norwegian newspaper published in the municipality of Sola in Rogaland county. 

Solabladet is owned by Nordsjø Media and is politically independent. The newspaper was launched on January 24, 1991, and its office is located in Solakrossen. It is published in a paper edition on Tuesdays and online every day at solabladet.no. The paper is edited by Helene Pahr-Iversen, who succeeded Bernt Eirik Rød after his unexpected death in 2014.

Circulation
According to the Norwegian Audit Bureau of Circulations and National Association of Local Newspapers, Solabladet has had the following annual circulation:
 2006: 3,870
 2007: 4,057
 2008: 4,249
 2009: 3,930
 2010: 3,972
 2011: 3,926
 2012: 3,812
 2013: 3,783
 2014: 3,663
 2015: 3,678
 2016: 3,530

References

External links
Solabladet homepage

Newspapers published in Norway
Norwegian-language newspapers
Sola, Norway
Mass media in Rogaland
Publications established in 1991
1991 establishments in Norway